Idrissa Coulibaly (born 19 December 1987) is a Malian professional footballer who plays as a defender.

Club career
Born in Bamako, Mali, Coulibaly began his career at the age of 10 in the junior ranks of JS Centre Salif Keita. In 2006, while many of his teammates were promoted to the first team, Coulibaly was not offered the chance. He decided to quit the club and began training with another local club. However, after 15 days, JS Centre Salif Keita convinced him to return and he was promoted shortly after that to the first team.

In winter of 2008, Coulibaly received offers from two local clubs, Djoliba AC and Real Bamako, as well as from Algerian club JS Kabylie. French club FC Nantes also wanted to take the player on trial.

JS Kabylie
On 7 January 2008, it was announced that Coulibaly would join JS Kabylie on a three-year contract. In his first season with the club, Coulibaly helped the club win the Algerian Championnat National.

On 14 December 2010, Coulibaly was chosen as the Best Foreign Player in the Algerian league in 2010.

On 22 December 2010, it was announced that Coulibaly signed a one and a half year contract with Libyan club Al-Ahly Tripoli, joining them on a free transfer. However, in an interview four days later, Coulibaly said he simply signed a pre-contract with the club and was still undecided with regards to his future destination. He is engaged with Tunisian team Club Africain after agreement between Al ahly Tripoly until June 2014.

Espérance
On 6 August 2011, Coulibaly joined Tunisian club Espérance de Tunis.

Lekhwiya
He joined French Ligue 2 side FC Istres in September 2012, but was not signed due to an administrative problem. Instead, he went on a five-month loan to Qatari side Lekhwiya as a replacement for Madjid Bougherra.

Raja Casablanca
In June 2013, Coulibaly returned to Africa for Raja Casablanca. He signed a two-year deal with the Moroccan club. Coulibaly was loaned to Hassania Agadir for the 2014-2015 season.

Arouca
On 7 July 2015, he signed a one-year deal with Portuguese club Arouca.

International career
On 17 June 2007, Coulibaly made his debut for the Malian national team in a 6–0 win against Sierra Leone in a 2008 African Cup of Nations qualifier.

He was also capped at the Under-23 level for Mali.

Honours
JS Kabylie
 Algerian League: 2008

References

External links

 
 

Living people
1987 births
Sportspeople from Bamako
Association football defenders
Malian footballers
Mali international footballers
Malian expatriate footballers
JS Kabylie players
Expatriate footballers in Algeria
Malian expatriate sportspeople in Algeria
JS Centre Salif Keita players
Algerian Ligue Professionnelle 1 players
Expatriate footballers in Libya
Expatriate footballers in Tunisia
Espérance Sportive de Tunis players
2012 Africa Cup of Nations players
Expatriate footballers in France
Malian expatriate sportspeople in France
Lekhwiya SC players
Expatriate footballers in Qatar
Malian expatriate sportspeople in Qatar
Qatar Stars League players
Raja CA players
F.C. Arouca players
Primeira Liga players
Expatriate footballers in Morocco
2013 Africa Cup of Nations players
2015 Africa Cup of Nations players
Malian expatriate sportspeople in Tunisia
Malian expatriate sportspeople in Libya
Malian expatriate sportspeople in Morocco
Al-Nahda Club (Saudi Arabia) players
Saudi First Division League players
Expatriate footballers in Saudi Arabia
Malian expatriate sportspeople in Saudi Arabia
21st-century Malian people